"Drink to Get Drunk" is a song by Sia. It was included her album Healing Is Difficult (2001). The song was released as a single in 2001 after it was remixed by Gino Scaletti and Quinn Whalley (also known as DifferentGear).

Track listing
 CD maxi
 "Drink to Get Drunk" (DifferentGear Radio Edit)	 -3:58
 "Drink to Get Drunk" (DifferentGear Mix) - 	7:53
 "Drink to Get Drunk" (Make Mine a Becks Mix) - 	6:16
 "Drink to Get Drunk" (Album Version) - 	3:37

Charts 
The song peaked at number 1 on the Belgian Dance Chart in January 2001.

Weekly charts

Cover versions
 In April 2002, British house DJ and producer Chris Lake released another remix of the song through Maelstrom Records.
 In October 2011, Dutch electronic dance music producer Sander van Doorn released a cover version through Spinnin Records.

References

2000 songs
2001 singles
Sia (musician) songs
Chris Lake songs
Songs about alcohol
Songs written by Sia (musician)